David or Dave Martin may refer to:

Entertainment
David Martin (artist) (1737–1797), Scottish painter and engraver
David Stone Martin (1913–1992), American artist
David Martin (poet) (1915–1997), Hungarian-Australian poet and novelist
Dave Martin (screenwriter) (1935–2007), writer for the television program Doctor Who
Dave Martin (jazz musician) (1907–1975), jazz pianist and songwriter
David A. Martin (musician) (1937–1987), American pop musician with Sam the Sham & the Pharaohs
David Martin (humorist) (born 1950), Canadian humorist and newspaper columnist
Dave Martin (chef), contestant on the reality television program Top Chef
David L. Martin, role-playing games artist

Politics
David Martin (Michigan politician) (born 1961), Republican State Assemblyman
David Martin (Nebraska politician) (1907–1997), Republican U.S. Representative
David Martin (Wisconsin politician) (born 1931), Republican State Assemblyman
David Martin (mayor) (born 1953), politician in Stamford, Connecticut
David O'Brien Martin (1944–2012), Republican New York U.S. Representative
David Martin (English politician) (born 1945), Conservative MP
David Martin (Scottish politician) (born 1954), Labour party MEP for Scotland
Sir David Martin (governor) (1933–1990), Australian admiral, NSW Governor
David C. Martin (politician), Florida state senator

Sports

Football
Boy Martin (Davy Martin, 1914–1991), Northern Irish footballer
Dave Martin (footballer, born 1963), English footballer
Dave Martin (footballer, born 1985), English footballer with Whitehawk F.C.
David Martin (footballer, born 1964), Scottish footballer
David Martin (footballer, born 1986), English football goalkeeper
David Martín (footballer, born 1992), Spanish footballer
Dave Martin (linebacker) (born 1946), American football linebacker
David Martin (cornerback) (born 1959), American football player
David Martin (tight end) (born 1979), American football player
Dave Martin (soccer) (born 1988), American soccer player

Other sports
David Martin (tennis) (born 1981)
David Martín (water polo) (born 1977), Spanish water polo player
Dave Martin (snooker player) (born 1948), English snooker player
David Martin (gymnast) (born 1977), French trampoline gymnast

Other
David Martin (French theologian) (1639–1721), French theologian
David Grier Martin (1910–1974), president of Davidson College
Sir David Christie Martin (1914–1976), Scottish-born scientific administrator
David Martin (criminal), escaped prisoner in the 1980s
David A. Martin (lawyer), American lawyer
David Martin (Kansas judge) (1839–1901), Chief Justice of the Kansas Supreme Court
David Martin (journalist) (born 1943), American television news correspondent
David Martin (sociologist) (1929–2019), British academic
David C. Martin, American architect
David N. Martin (1930–2012), American advertising executive
Dave Martin (sportscaster), American sports announcer

See also
David Forbes Martyn (1906–1970), Scottish-born Australian physicist and radiographer
David Marteen, Dutch privateer
David Martín (disambiguation)
David Martí (born 1971), actor and makeup specialist